The Colgate Raiders women's ice hockey team is an NCAA Division I ice hockey team that represents Colgate University and play in ECAC Hockey. The Raiders play their home games at Class of 1965 Arena. The Raiders have played in Division I hockey since the 2001–02 season after playing at the NCAA Division III from 1997 to 2001.

History

1973–1983: The Early Years

From 1973 to 1974, Colgate Women's hockey started as an intramural team. Despite interest from the players in making the team varsity, the  Athletic Director said the team would require "sustained interest."  In 1974, Colgate Women's Hockey became club team. For the players from 1974 to 1983, 57% had never played on a team before Colgate women's hockey. 92% had never played hockey before, and 62% started by playing on figure skates, using masking tape over the toe picks. Many pieces of equipment and uniforms were "hand me downs" from the men's team. Players had to purchase their own sticks, skates and jerseys. The women's team practiced when ice time was available, which was usually late, after intramural games were completed, usually at 10 p.m.. Damp, smelly pads would be passed from intramural players to the women – given a brief spray of sanitizer by the student intramural equipment minder during the transfer.

During these years, the team played other colleges up and down the east coast, including Cornell, St. Lawrence, Oswego and Ithaca. The team played at Middlebury and Williams, but since they didn't have hockey rinks, they played in a curling rink. Whether checking would be allowed was determined before the game by the coaches. If a team didn't have pads for each suited player, there was no checking.

One memorable game in the early years included an 18–1 loss to Cornell, during which the Colgate goalie stopped 72 shots.

In the early years, players travelled to games in their own cars or used university vans, which they had to drive themselves. With no funding for transportation and accommodations, the players would often try to play near where some of the players lived and stayed at the player's family's house. For many games, players had to call around to find out who could make the game, what positions they could play and if they had a jersey.

Coaching the team was a volunteer job, and it was an unpaid and time-consuming one, so it was often difficult for the team to find coaches. One of Colgate women's hockey's first coaches was Mike Milbury.

Cook v. Colgate University

In 1993, the Colgate Women's Hockey Team was granted varsity status after a decision from the United States Court of Appeals, Second Circuit.

Colgate University appealed an original judgment entered in the United States District Court for the Northern District of New York, ordering it to elevate its women's club ice hockey team to varsity status and to provide equal funding and benefits to its men's and women's ice hockey programs. The plaintiffs were Jennifer Baldwin Cook, Melissa Ehlers, Christine Price, Thayer Jaques and Julie Wolff, who were all either current or former Colgate students and former members of Colgate's women's club ice hockey team. Frustrated by Colgate's continued reluctance to elevate the program to varsity status, the plaintiffs filed in court on April 10, 1990, alleging that Colgate's failure to provide a comparable ice hockey program to men and women students violated Title IX of the Education Amendments of 1972, 20 U.S.C. §§ 1681-1688 (1990), the regulations of the Department of Education, as well as the Fifth and Fourteenth Amendments to the Constitution. For its part, Colgate denied any discrimination and argued that its compliance with the mandates of Title IX should be measured by its overall athletic program, not by a sport-by-sport comparison. Ultimately, Cook et al., won the judgement.

1997–2001

Colgate women's hockey went varsity in 1997. The team was initially Division III but transitioned to Division I in 2001.

2001–11
In 2008-2009, Kimberly Sass set a school record for most wins in a season by a goaltender with 14 games. Sass finished the season as one of the top ranked goalies in the ECAC. Her .941 save percentage was first in the ECAC. Her 1.85 goals against average was sixth while her .656 win percentage was fourth. From October 7–8, 2011: In a pair of victories over the Lindenwood Lions, Brittany Phillips accumulated a total of 10 points. In the 7–2 victory on October 7, she notched two goals, while logging an assist. One of the goals was the game-winning goal.

The following day, she had seven points (two goals, five assists) in an 8–2 win. Of the four goals she scored, two were power play goals. Her seven points ranked second in program history for most points in one game. The five assists ranked second for most assists in one game. In addition, Melissa Kueber registered six points in the sweep. On October 8, she led the team with four goals scored in an 8–2 triumph over the Lions. She also notched an assist. The four tallies tied for first in program history for most scores in one game.

2012–present
Greg Fargo began as head coach in the 2012-2013 season. Prior to coaching at Colgate, he was head coach for the women's ice hockey team at Elmira, in NCAA Division III, for four seasons. Fargo played his college hockey career as a goaltender, at Elmira.

In 2015-2016, Colgate had its first 22 win season, setting a program record.

Colgate had its most successful year in program history during the 2017–18 season. The Raiders finished 34–6–1, setting a new program record for wins.  They finished tied with Clarkson for first in the ECAC conference, with a 19–3 (.864) record, earning their first ECAC league title. They qualified for the NCAA tournament for the first time, and advanced to the championship game after beating Northeastern in the quarterfinals by a score of 3–1, and Wisconsin in the semi-finals in a 4–3 victory.

The championship game against conference rival Clarkson was a close contest.  Clarkson scored first, at 16:29 in the opening period, on a goal by forward Cassidy Vinkle, assisted by Kelly Mariani. It was the only goal Colgate goalie Julia Vandyk allowed in regulation. Colgate tied the score at 2:27 in the second period, on an equalizer by Malia Schneider, her 16th of the season, with assists from Olivia Zafuto and Bre Wilson-Bennett. The teams went scoreless in the third period and ended regulation at 1–1. At 7:55 in the first overtime, Elizabeth Giguere scored the game-winner, to give Clarkson the national championship. Finishing as national runner-up, the season saw the highest finish for the Raiders in Colgate program history. Head coach Greg Fargo won the 2017–18 Division I AHCA Coach of the Year award, given by the American Hockey Coaches Association.

Year by year

Roster

2022–23 Raiders
As of September 6, 2022.

Awards and honors
Cheryl Setchell, Forward, 2002 ECAC North All-Rookie Team
Kiira Dosdall, Canadian Women's Hockey League Draft, Boston Blades, 8th round, #40 overall (2013)
Kiira Dosdall, Defense, 2009 Second Team All-ECAC
Jessie Eldridge: Women’s Hockey Commissioners Association Player of the Month - February 2019
Melissa Kueber, ECAC Rookie of the Week (Week of October 17, 2011)
Rebecca Lahar, Goalie, 2002 ECAC North All-Rookie Team
Brittany Phillips, ECAC Player of the Week (Week of October 17, 2011)
Kimberly Sass, 2009 All-ECAC First Team (Sass was the first Raiders player to be named to the First Team)
Kimberly Sass, ECAC All-Rookie Team
Greg Fargo, 2018 AHCA Coach of the Year

All-America honors
Danielle Serdachny, 2020–21 CCM/ACHA First-Team All-American

ECAC Awards
Kimberly Sass: 2009 ECAC Goaltender of the Year
Danielle Serdachny: 2021 ECAC Player of the Year
Danielle Serdachny: 2021 ECAC Best Forward

ECAC Monthly Awards
 Jessie Eldridge: ECAC Player of the Month (December 2018)
 Jessie Eldridge: ECAC Player of the Month (February 2019)
 Kayle Osborne, ECAC Adirondack Health Rookie of the Month (January 2021) 
 Kayle Osborne, ECAC MAC Goaltending Goalie of the Month (March 2021)
 Sammy Smigliani, ECAC Army ROTC Player of the Month (March 2021)

ECAC All-Rookie Team
Sydney Bard, 2019–20 ECAC All-Rookie Team
Danielle Serdachny, 2019–20 ECAC All-Rookie Team

Team awards
Brad Houston Most Valuable Offensive Player

Most Valuable Defensive Player

Most Improved Player

Rookie of the Year

Sportsmanship Award

Marian Lefevre Coach's Award, previously the Interest, Attitude & Dedication award. Discontinued after 2015–2016 season

Don Palmateer Award, awarded by the Center Ice Club to the player whose leadership, inspiration and performance on the ice and off during her career has had the greatest impact on Colgate women's hockey.

2021 
Kayle Osborne 
- All time lowest GPA

All-Time Scoring Leaders

Additional Records 
 Points in a game: Heather Murphy, vs RPI 1/14/01....12
 Longest point scoring streak: Sam Hunt, 14 games....21
 Points in a season: Amanda Barre (04–05).................39
 Most goals in a game: Heather Murphy vs Hamilton 11/30/99....4
 Longest goal scoring streak: Heather Murphy.............12
 Most goals scored in a season: Katie Stewart (09–10)...24
 Most goals scored in a career: Heather Murphy ('99-'02).....77
 Most assists in a game: Heather Murphy vs MIT................6
 Longest assist scoring streak: Heather Murphy................15
 Most assists in a season: Becky Irvine............................25
 Most penalty minutes in a game: Kiira Dosdall, Ali Edell, Brittany Phillips....17
 Most consecutive games with a penalty: Brittany Phillips, Kiira Dosdall.....20
 Most penalty minutes in a season: Brittany Phillips........79
 Most penalty minutes in a career: Brittany Phillips......238
 Most power play goals in a season: Brittany Phillips...9
 Most power play goals in a career: Sam Hunt.......24
 Most short handed goals in a season: Jessie Eldridge....4
 Most short handed goals in a career: Sam Hunt.....9
 Most game willing goals in a season: Becky Irvine....9
 Most game-winning goals in a career: Heather Murphy....13
 Most games played in a career: Katelyn Parker....141
 Most consecutive games played: Katelyn Parker...141
 Most minutes in a season: Julia VanDyk....1941:41
 Most minutes in a career: Rebecca Lahar....6072:38
 Most shutouts in a season: Kimberly Sass....5
 Most Consecutive Shutout Minutes: Jen Burtaw....231:24
 Most shutouts in a career: Rebecca Lahar....13
 Most wins in a season: Julia Vandyk....20
 Most wins in a career: Rebecca Lahar...35
 Best goals against average in a season: Brook Wheeler.....1.76
 Best goals against average in a career: Jen Burtaw.........1.96
 Most saves in a season: Rebecca Lahar......1083
 Most saves in a career: Rebecca Lahar...3028
 Best saves percentage in a season: Brook Wheeler.... .931
 Best saves percentage in a career: Elayana Hamashuk... .923

Notable players
Kiira Dosdall
Sam Hunt
Tara French
Becky Irvine
Julia Vandyk, 2016–2017, set the record for most career wins with 36; most minutes in a season, 2016–2017; most wins in a season, 20, 2015–2016;
Liz Auby, 2016–2017, had a shutout streak of three games. It is tied for the longest in program history, while her minutes streak of 200:36 is the second longest in program history behind Jen Burtaw's streak of 231:24 from the 1999–2000 season, before the program entered the Division I level.
During the 2008–09 season, Kimberly Sass earned ECAC Rookie of the Week honors five times and the ECAC Goaltender of the Week award once. On November 8, 2009, she recorded a career and season high 46 saves as the Raiders defeated Princeton. Against the Yale Bulldogs on January 24, Sass earned a shutout. In three different games, she surpassed 40 saves and eclipsed 30 saves in ten games.
Maura Crowell, class of 2002, is the head coach of the University of Minnesota Duluth Bulldogs, and was head coach for the USA U-18 women's national ice hockey team in 2017-2018 and 2018-19.

International 
Livia Altmann, Swiss National Team, Sochi Olympics, Bronze Medal (2014)
Livia Altmann, Swiss National Team, Pyeongchang Olympics (2018)
Livia Altmann, Switzerland National Team – Nation Cup (2017–2018)
Shae Labbe, Canadian National Women's Development Team (2016);  2014–15 Canada Under-18 Team
Brittany Phillips, IIHF World U18 Championships, Canada, Silver (2009)
Kaila Pinkney, IIHF World U18 Championships, Canada, Gold
Lauren Wildfang, IIHF World U18 Championships, Canada, Gold (2014)
Breanne Wilson-Bennett, IIHF World U18 Championships, Canada, Gold (2014)
Tara French, Canadian Under 22 Team (2005)
Becky Irvine, Canadian Under-22 Team (2005)
Sam Hunt, Canadian Under-22 Team (2006)
Sam Hunt, Canadian Under-22 Team (2005)
Malia Schneider, 2014–2015 Canada Under-18 Team
Rebecca Lahaer, 2004 USA Under-22 Team
Maura Crowell ('02), Head Coach for the USA Under 18 Team (2017-18 & 2018-19)

Raiders in professional hockey

Notable fans 

 Gordon Denis
 Kyle Eldridge
 Mathis Mateus
 In one particular tense rivalry game against Clarkson University, fans Denis and Mateus notably dressed as hot dogs to distract the other team. The method was largely considered successful, as the Raiders walked away with a 4-1 victory.

See also
Colgate Raiders men's ice hockey
Colgate Raiders

References

External links
 
 Cook v. Colgate University

 
Ice hockey teams in New York (state)